Right to Be (formerly Hollaback!) is a nonprofit organization to raise awareness about and combat harassment, both online and in-person, through intervention trainings, a photoblog, and grassroots initiatives.

In May 2010, co-founder Emily May became Hollaback!'s first full-time executive director, and the organization successfully raised close to $15,000 on the internet fundraising platform, Kickstarter, to fund the development and release of the Hollaback! iPhone application. Since then, the organization has received funding from New York Women's Foundation, the Ms. Foundation, Voqal, the Knight Foundation, Ashoka, and the New York City Government.

History

Seven New York City residents, four women and three men, founded the organization in 2005, under the not for profit, Artistic Evolucion, Inc, after a well-publicized occurrence of street harassment prompted them to discuss their own encounters.  After being ignored by the police, a woman named Thao Nguyen uploaded a photo she had taken of the man who had masturbated across from her on the subway.  This photo appeared on the front page of the New York Daily News, and inspired the seven New York City residents to apply this same method to all forms of street harassment.  The women told story after story of their experiences with street harassment, experiences that were surprising to the men in the group because they had never dealt with harassment of that kind. They collectively decided to do something about the issue of street harassment, an issue that affects women, girls, and LGBTQ individuals every day.

Hollaback! has held many events around the world designed to raise awareness about street harassment, including film screenings, lectures, demonstrations, and book talks.

On October 28, 2010, the New York City Council held the first hearing ever on street harassment.  Council Member Julissa Ferreras, who chairs the Women's Issues Committee, called the hearing in order to stress the importance of joining forces in order to take action specifically in New York City. Each panelist recommended three steps towards eliminating street harassment: 1) A citywide study, focusing on the impact of street harassment and girls; 2) a citywide public information campaign that educates all genders and ages that harassment is unacceptable is the second point of action proposed; and 3) establishing "harassment-free zones" in schools in order to raise awareness and support of the movement. Emily May was among the speakers at the hearing; she encouraged women to speak out against street harassment.

After this hearing, New York City legislators invested $28,500 in Hollaback!. This investment gave the organization the infrastructure needed to report street harassment incidents to the New York City Council, via their platform "Councilstat."

As of August 2012, multiple branches of the Hollaback! blog exist in other U.S. cities including Atlanta, Baltimore, Berkeley, Houston, Des Moines, Chicago, Columbia, Philadelphia and Portland.

In 2013, the London branch was involved in Project Guardian, a police initiative to reduce sexual harassment on public transport, including assisting in training of police officers to respond to complaints of sexual assaults.

International Leadership Development - Global Site Leader Program
In January 2011, Hollaback! scaled internationally.  As of October 2014, the organization has sites in 79 cities in 26 countries.

Prior to launching a new site, site leaders are first trained by Hollaback! employees so that they will have the skills necessary to operate their own blog.  Future site leaders are given the chance to interact with one another and the Hollaback! team, host events, and build partnerships with community members and media outlets. Even after site leaders successfully launch their own branch of the organization, they remain active participants in the Hollaback! community. The various branches work in coalition to further develop the organization, translate the Hollaback! website, and create shared resources. In addition, site leaders receive monthly training in topics ranging from blogging to rape culture to holding events.

Hollaback! provides guidance in bystander intervention the form of "The Five D's" - Direct, Distract, Delegate, Delay, and Document.

HeartMob 
HeartMob is a platform to help end online harassment.

College Initiative

The Hollaback! "College Initiative" is a campaign that aims to end sexual harassment on college campuses.  To do this, Hollaback! will give students the means to submit their experiences of harassment through the free iPhone and Droid apps, as well as their campus-specific Hollaback! website, which will link to a mapping system that will allow Hollaback! to track incidents of campus harassment. Hollaback! will use the mapping system to demonstrate the impact of harassment to campus staff and administrators.

When victims of harassment share their experiences on the Hollaback! website, their stories are read by hundreds of other people. Reading about incidents of harassment has often inspired individuals to become enraged and seek change. The "College Initiative," like the initial Hollaback! mission, "will create a safe, action-oriented response to campus harassment and assault. By using data to establish the case against campus harassment, Hollaback!'s social change efforts will ultimately result in significant improvements in campus policy and a reduction in sexual harassment against students."

Anti-harassment video

In October 2014, Rob Bliss Creative created a video which showed Shoshana Roberts, a white woman in New York City, being harassed by men. In one scene, a man followed Shoshana for five minutes. The video included a call to donate to Hollaback! in order to stop this harassment.

While 30–40% of the incidents of harassment in the video are perpetrated by white men, men of color are on camera for the largest portion of the video. Numerous writers accused the video of being racist. The organization later apologized for the "racial bias" in the video. A petition at change.org was created to ask Hollaback! to release the entire 10 hours of footage, so people can see if it the two-minute video was selectively edited to be racist. Hollaback! was not able to release the footage because they didn't make it or own it, it was created by Rob Bliss. Response to the video has included rape and death threats to subject of the video and some journalists defended the behavior shown in the video, in some cases adding catcalls of their own.

References

External links
 
 Barnard Center For Research on Women
 

Photoblogs
American blogs
Internet properties established in 2005
Feminist blogs
Feminist protests
Feminist organizations in the United States